Little Petherick is a village and civil parish in north Cornwall, England, United Kingdom. It is situated two miles (3 kilometres) south of Padstow and 6 miles (9 kilometres) west of Wadebridge. As of the 2011 census its population is included in the civil parish of St Issey Little Petherick lies in the valley of Little Petherick Creek, a tidal tributary of the River Camel: however, upstream of Little Petherick the creek ceases to be tidal. The village straddles the A389 Wadebridge-Padstow road which crosses the creek at the east end of the village on a Grade II listed 19th century bridge.

Parish church
It was originally built in the 14th century and is now Grade I listed. (John) Athelstan Riley (1858–1945) was patron of this church and a notable benefactor, responsible for employing Ninian Comper to restore it in 1908: his work includes the high altar, reredos and rood screen. Other features of interest are the monuments to Sir Roger de Lemporu, 13th century, and Andalusia, the Hon. Mrs. J. A. Riley, née Molesworth (d. 1912), ca. 1916; the Flemish 17th century relief in the north chapel. Arthur Mee was impressed by the beauty of this bronze monument.

The official name of the parish is St Petroc Minor (distinguishing it from Padstow or Petrockstow). According to tradition St Petroc passed this way before settling at Bodmin. The parish was until 1830 a Bishop's peculiar and within the episcopal manor of Pawton. The church was rebuilt in 1745 and the Molesworth family have since been notable benefactors.

Mining
A copper mine at Creddis was a small scale venture in Little Petherick. The shaft at Creddis was no deeper than thirty fathoms (55 m) and employed about forty men. Adjoining Creddis, but in the parish of St Issey, was the copper mine of Legossick. This had a steam engine on it, being a large adventure, it employed many men. There were a few mines of this sort in the area; and one, Wheal Paynter showed a course of lead at twelve fathoms (22 m).

Little Petherick Creek
The village gives its name to the tidal creek of the River Camel, the location most likely being chosen as the highest navigable point with evidence of quays here still being visible.

Between Little Petherick and the River Camel is Sea Mills. Here a tidal lagoon was created to capture the rising tide, the outflow being diverted via a tide mill used to grind flour.

References

 Park, Jo (1982) Athelstan Riley, patron of St Petroc Minor, Little Petherick. Truro: [the Compiler] (includes extracts from the diaries of Athelstan and Andalusia Riley)
 [Riley, Athelstan?] (ca. 1910) The Church and Parish of St Petroc Minor of Nansfounteyn, Little Petherick, Cornwall.

External links

Villages in Cornwall